Tauranga Boys' College is a state secondary school for boys, located on the edge of the downtown area of Tauranga, New Zealand. The school was founded in 1946 as Tauranga College, before overcrowding saw the school become single-sex in 1958. The school has a roll of  students from years 9 to 13 (approx. ages 13 to 18) as of  In 2019 Tauranga Boys' gained the most scholarships in the Bay of Plenty region with 31 scholarships and 6 outstanding scholarships.

History
Secondary education in Tauranga began in 1900, with the establishment of a district high school joined with Tauranga School. By the mid-1930s, the buildings were inadequate for use, and a push for a separate secondary school began. In 1937, the education board purchased the motor camp "Hillsdene", originally one of the  blocks laid out after the Battle of Gate Pā. However, World War II delayed building on the site until 1944. After two years of building, Tauranga College was opened on 5 February 1946. The college ran until 1958 – due to overcrowding, female students moved to a newly built campus, which was named Tauranga Girls' College. Male students remained in Tauranga College, which became known as Tauranga Boys' College.

The college seeks to honour the past in creating the future. This includes honours boards recognising top scholars and New Zealand representative sportsmen, the naming of buildings after former principals and assorted trees and memorials for World War II victims and students who died whilst enrolled.

The College is the holder of the NZSS Boys' First XI Football title, won with a 1-0 victory in the final in Napier on September 2, 2022.

Principals
 1958–1959: Mr A. G. Nicholson
 1959–1967: Mr G. I. N. Sim
 1967–1971: Mr R. E. K. Barton
 1971–1984: Mr N. D. Morris
 1984–2008: Mr G. S. Young
 2008–2022: Mr R. W. Mangan
 2022–: Mr A. G. Turner

Houses 
Tauranga Boys' College has six houses. The houses are all named after prominent New Zealanders. In alphabetical order, they are:
Freyberg (red), named after soldier Bernard Freyberg
Halberg (black), named after athlete Murray Halberg
Hillary (yellow), named after mountaineer Edmund Hillary
Ngarimu (green), named after soldier Moana-Nui-a-Kiwa Ngarimu
Ngata (white), named after politician Āpirana Ngata
Rutherford (blue), named after scientist Ernest Rutherford

Notable alumni

Academia 
 Bryan Gould – Rhodes Scholar, UK Labour politician & Vice Chancellor University of Waikato
 A. Rod Gover – Rhodes Scholar

The Arts 
 Nigel Brown ONZM – artist
 Shane Cortese – actor
 Malcolm Evans – cartoonist
 Ian Mune OBE – actor
 Erik Thomson – actor
 Richard O'Brien – actor
 Jeremy Redmore – musician
 Stuart G. Bugg – international debating

Public service 
 Tuariki Delamere – politician & Commonwealth Games athlete
 Air Marshal Sir Bruce Ferguson – KNZM, OBE, AFC Chief of New Zealand Defence Force
 Todd Muller – Member of Parliament for the Bay of Plenty (2014–present) and former Leader of the Opposition (New Zealand)

Sport 

 Kris Bouckenooghe – NZ Football 
 Brendon Bracewell – NZ Cricket 
 John Bracewell – NZ Cricket 
 Daniel Braid – All Black
 Mick Bremner – All Black
 Peter Burke – All Black
 Peter Burling (born 1991), Olympic sailor
 Sam Cane – All Black
 Adrian Cashmore – All Black
 John Clark – NZ Rowing – 1972 Olympian
 Stuart Conn – All Black
 Geoff Cotter NZ Rowing – 1988 Olympian
 Mahé Drysdale (born 1978), Olympic rower
 Daniel Flynn – NZ Cricket
 Steve Graham – NZ Hockey 
 Wayne Graham – All Black
 Andy Hayward – NZ Hockey 
 Nathan Harris – All Black
 Jarrad Hoeata – All Black
 Brendon Julian – Australian cricketer
 Greg Kane – All Black
 Tanerau Latimer – All Black
 Tony Lochhead – NZ Football, 2010 Fifa World Cup representative
 Sam Meech (born 1991), Olympic sailor
 Brent Newdick – NZ decathlete, Commonwealth Games silver medallist
 Jordan Parry – NZ Rowing – 2020 Olympian
 David Rayner – NZ Football 
 Aidan Ross – All Black
 Greg Rowlands – All Black
 Jason Saunders (born 1991), Olympic sailor
 Paul Simonsson – All Black
 Owen Stephens – All Black and Wallaby; rugby union and rugby league 
 Roger White-Parsons – NZ Rowing – 1984 Olympian
 Kane Williamson – NZ Cricket
 Royce Willis – All Black

References

Boys' schools in New Zealand
Educational institutions established in 1958
Secondary schools in the Bay of Plenty Region
Schools in Tauranga
1958 establishments in New Zealand